Brokencyde (stylized as brokeNCYDE) is an American hip hop group from Albuquerque, New Mexico, founded in 2006. The group's lineup consists of David "Se7en" Gallegos and Michael "Mikl" Shea, and musically are one of the founding groups in the crunkcore genre, which (in general description) is crunk hip hop music with screamed vocals.

History

Formation, record deal and debut album (2006–2009)

Brokencyde was founded by singers Se7en and Mikl. The name of the group supposedly originated from the idea that their music was "broke inside" due to personal problems. After the band began promoting themselves online, members Phat J and Antz joined Brokencyde. They released their debut mixtape, The Broken!, in July 2007, followed by another mixtape, Tha $c3ne Mixtape (2008).

Brokencyde toured with bands such as Breathe Carolina, The Morning Of, Karate High School, and Drop Dead, Gorgeous. In July 2008, Brokencyde appeared on MTV's Total Request Live, where they performed the single "FreaXXX" on the segment "Under the Radar". They signed with Suburban Noize Records later that summer, and released the BC13 EP on November 11, 2008 during a promotion with the retail chain Hot Topic.

In 2008, the group performed dates on the Millionaires-headlined "Get F$cked Up" tour, and appeared twice on "Fearless Music TV", performing "Sex Toyz" and "FreaXXX" in December 2008.

The group's first full-length release, I'm Not a Fan, But the Kids Like It!, debuted at #86 on the Billboard 200 in July 2009. Brokencyde was featured on the US Warped Tour 2009, but left the tour in August to play featured appearances in Europe.

Later Brokencyde played dates on "The Original Gangstour" tour with Eyes Set to Kill, And Then There Were None, and Drop Dead, Gorgeous. They played dates on the "Saints and Sinners Tour 2009" with Senses Fail, Hollywood Undead, and Haste The Day.

Will Never Die, Guilty Pleasure and departure of Phat J and Antz (2010–2014)

In early 2010, the band released two songs for free download on their Myspace. The songs were "I'm Da Shizzit" and a cover of the song "Sexy Bitch" by David Guetta. In the summer Brokencyde co-headlined the 2 DRUNK 2 FUCK tour with Jeffree Star. Soon after the tour ended they announced that they were in the studio. In the beginning of fall their new album was announced to be complete with the title of Will Never Die. The album was released on Break Silence Recordings on November 9. In winter 2010, Brokencyde co-headlined the KA$H 4 KU$H tour with the Millionaires. On October 30, the video for "Teach Me How to Scream" was released via MySpace.

The group released their third studio album Guilty Pleasure on November 8, 2011. An updated version was later released on March 13, 2012 titled Guilty Pleasurez which the band is supporting with a European "Guilty Pleasurez" tour.

In 2012, Brokencyde played dates on the "Fight to Unite Tour" alongside other acts including Blood on the Dance Floor, Deuce (formerly of Hollywood Undead), Polkadot Cadaver, William Control and The Bunny the Bear. On October 29, 2012, Julian "Phat J" McClellan announced via his official YouTube page that he was amicably leaving Brokencyde to pursue a solo career.

All Grown Up (2014–2018)
In December 2014, Brokencyde launched an Indiegogo crowdfunding campaign, seeking US$30,000 to help fund the recording and marketing of a new album titled All Grown Up. By the time the funding period ended in February 2015, the band only managed to raise US$1,421 from 33 backers — less than 5% of their intended goal. Nevertheless, the group still self-released a 23-track album titled All Grown Up.

0 to Brokencyde (2018)
In April 2018, the band announced that they had signed a deal with Cleopatra Records through which they would be releasing their fourth album on Cleopatra Records' imprint, X-Ray Records. The album, 0 to Brokencyde, was released on June 22, 2018.

Critical reception
Brokencyde is widely panned by critics. Cracked.com contributor Michael Swaim said the band sounded like "a Slipknot-Cher duet", while another Cracked contributor Adam Tod Brown commented on their song FreaXXX "I hate that song so much that I would hold it face down in a bathtub until it drowns if I could."

British comic book writer Warren Ellis considered Brokencyde's "FreaXXX" music video "a near-perfect snapshot of everything that's shit about this point in the culture". A writer for the Warsaw Business Journal attempted to describe their music: "Imagine an impassioned triceratops mating with a steam turbine, while off to the side Daft Punk and the Bee Gees beat each other to death with skillets and spatulas. Imagine the sound that would make. Just try. BrokeNCYDE is kind of like that, except it also makes you want to jab your thumbs into your eyeballs and gargle acid."

The New Musical Express stated in a review of I'm Not a Fan, But the Kids Like It!, that "even if I caught Prince Harry and Gary Glitter adorned in Nazi regalia defecating through my grandmother's letterbox I would still consider making them listen to this album too severe a punishment."

August Brown of the Los Angeles Times writes: "This 'Albucrazy'-based band has done for MySpace emo what some think Soulja Boy did for hip-hop: turn their career into a kind of macro-performance art that exists so far beyond the tropes of irony and sincerity that to ask 'are they kidding?' is like trying to peel an onion to get to a perceived central core that, in the end, does not exist and renders all attempts to reassemble the pieces futile."

In the late 2010s and early 2020s, several music critics described Brokencyde as an antecedent to hyperpop artists like 100 gecs.

Members

Current members
David "Se7en" Gallegos – screamed vocals, rap vocals (2006–present)
Michael "Mikl" Shea – clean vocals, rap vocals (2006–present)

Touring members
Paulo "Psuy?" Hidalgo – backing vocals (2011–present)
Ace Neroexistence – keyboards, programming (2011–present)
Chad "Big Chaco" Chadillac – drums (2011–present)

Former members
Julian "Phat J" McLellan – rap vocals, growled vocals, guitars, bass guitar, keyboards, synthesizers, programming (2007–2012)
Anthony "Antz" Trujillo – unclean vocals, rap vocals, programming, fog machine (2008–2014)

Timeline

Discography
Full-lengths

EPs

Other releases

References 

American hip hop groups
Crunkcore groups
Musical groups from New Mexico
Musical quartets
Musical groups established in 2006
2006 establishments in New Mexico
Rappers from New Mexico
Suburban Noize Records artists
Southern hip hop groups